Yair Mundlak (1927 - October 20, 2015) was an Israeli-American economist. He was a former professor at the University of Chicago and Hebrew University of Jerusalem.

References 

1927 births
2015 deaths
Israeli economists
Agricultural economists
University of California, Berkeley alumni
University of California, Davis alumni
Academic staff of the Hebrew University of Jerusalem
University of Chicago faculty
Fellows of the Econometric Society